The Sarajevo derby (Bosnian: Vječiti derbi, Sarajevski derbi) is a match between rivals from Bosnia and Herzegovina's capital city FK Željezničar Sarajevo and FK Sarajevo, the two biggest and most popular clubs in the country, during which fans usually create a competitive atmosphere with big flags, paper rolls, scarfs and loud chanting. It is not uncommon to see members of the same family on opposite sides, not speaking to each other on the day of the derby, with opposing fans engaging in mutual provocations at the end of the match, eagerly awaiting the next confrontation although, in recent years, this has led to clashes between some younger fans.

History
The history of the Sarajevo derby dates back to 1954, but the rivalry began eight years earlier. At the end of the World War II the three major clubs in Sarajevo, Đerzelez, SAŠK and Slavija, were disbanded by the new authorities which formed FK Sarajevo in 1946. Since the idea was for this new club to represent the city on a national level, SD Torpedo, as initially FK Sarajevo was called, needed the best players from the city. Numerous notable players were brought to the club, and they received good salaries for that time.  On the other side, FK Željezničar Sarajevo is a club which was formed by a group of railway workers much earlier, in 1921. However, until then, during the pre-war period, they were in the shadow of Đerzelez, SAŠK and Slavija and had never managed to qualify to the Yugoslav Championship. Željezničar won the second-tier Bosnian championship title in 1946, as part of the Yugoslav football league system, and that achievement marked the beginning of their climb. After the war, these two clubs became the most prominent and successful clubs in Sarajevo, and since then, the rivalry between the two has been intense.

FK Sarajevo supporters were considered to be upper-class individuals, mainly from Bosniak dominated old and central parts of town. On the other side, supporters of FK Željezničar were usually working-class with liberal image. Those differences were later partly erased. Both clubs have supporters from all classes and from all ethnic groups, even if FK Sarajevo fan base is still very predominately Bosniak. FK Željezničar has the image of a liberal club and they are popular even among other supporters in the region, while FK Sarajevo's support outside Sarajevo comes mostly from the Bosniak dominated areas in the region and diaspora.

Since they played in different levels, first matches between FK Željezničar and FK Sarajevo were friendlies. The first official league match was held in 1954; FK Sarajevo won 6–1. That is still the biggest victory by any team in these matches.

As of 26 August 2022, 127 league matches have been played. Željezničar have won 38 times, Sarajevo have won 36 times, while 53 matches ended in a draw. Goal difference is 146:145 in Sarajevo's favour. In all competitions, Željezničar and Sarajevo have played 147 times, Sarajevo have won 44 times, Željezničar have won 46 times and 57 games have ended in a draw.

Honours

All competitions

The Sarajevo derby is currently played three times a year in the Premier league, but they may also play against one another in other competitions. There are also friendly matches and games played in various tournaments. Although these games are not included in official statistics.

Head-to-head ranking in Premier League of Bosnia and Herzegovina

• Total: FK Sarajevo 16 times higher, FK Željezničar 11 times higher.

Records
 Most appearances: Slobodan Janjuš - 21 (16 for Željezničar, 5 for Sarajevo)
 Best goalscorers: Asim Ferhatović (Sarajevo), Dželaludin Muharemović (Željezničar) - 6 goals
 Record win: Željezničar - Torpedo 9:1 (29 December 1946, first derby match recorded)
 Biggest attendance: 55,000 (10 March 1982, Koševo Stadium)
 Double victory (two wins in a season): Željezničar (1968/1969, 1989/90, 2000/2001, 2015/16, 2017/18, 2019/20); Sarajevo (1955/1956, 1966/1967, 1998/1999, 2006/2007, 2018/19);
 Longest unbeaten run: 11 games (Sarajevo: 6 June 1963 – 1 December 1968; Željezničar: 15 October 2000 – 5 April 2006)
 Longest unbeaten run (home): 17 games (Željezničar: 3 April 1977 – 26 October 1997)
 Longest unbeaten run (away): 6 games (Sarajevo: 2 June 1963 – 29 June 1969; Željezničar: 28 April 2001 – 21 April 2007)
 Longest winning run: 3 games (Željezničar: 14 May 1988 – 10 December 1989; Sarajevo: 5 April 2006 – 21 April 2007)
 Longest winning run (home): 3 games (Željezničar two times: 23 August 1981 – 18 March 1984 & 10 October 1999 - 11 May 2002)
 Longest winning run (away): Two games by both teams on several occasions;
 Radmilo Mihajlović is the only player to score a hat-trick. (7 September 1986, Željezničar won 4-1).

Note that only league matches are included in statistics. Cup, other tournaments and friendly matches are not included.

Fans

Probably the best known thing about the Sarajevo derby are the fans. Usually, they are much more exciting to watch than the game itself. Especially in recent times, since the Bosnian championship has at times lacked in quality. Fans create an impressive atmosphere with loud cheering and original choreography. Both sides prepare intensely between the matches, make large flags and special messages that are appropriate for that particular occasion, to be usually directed towards the opposing side.

FK Željezničar's most passionate fans (wearing blue) are called Manijaci because their love for the club is on the edge of insanity, so it is said. They are located on the South side of stadium (the Holy South as they call it). The older fans ones are known affectionately as the Košpicari (which can metaphorically be translated as "seed eaters", although the name itself has different meaning - namely that of "seed sellers").

FK Sarajevo's most passionate fans (crimson) are called the Horde Zla (Evil hordes) after the popular Zagor comic book. In home games at Asim Ferhatović Hase Stadium, they are located on the North stands, while the older fans are known as the Pitari (similar to the Košpicari etymology except referring to pie and not seeds) and they are mainly on the East side.

When the derby is played on Grbavica Stadium, Horde zla are on the North-East side of the stadium, The Maniacs are on the East, South and West side, while the Pitari and Košpicari are on the North. When the game is played on Koševo, The Maniacs are on the South and South-West side, Horde zla on the North and the East. Pitari are on the East as well. West stands are mixed with both Pitari and Košpicari sitting there.

Results 1946–1992

League Results 1992–present

Little derby
Both the two big Sarajevo clubs have a rivalry with Slavija Sarajevo, a club dominated by Bosnian Serbs in eastern Sarajevo.

Another football club from Sarajevo was Olimpik; located in the small neighbourhood of Otoka, but their support group was very small.

Olimpik's games between its rivals, FK Sarajevo and FK Željezničar, in town were known as the little town derby (Mali gradski derbi). After Olimpik were relegated from the Premier League in the 2016–17 season, until the 2020–21 season, the little derby was not hosted.

References

External links

Football Derbies - Sarajevo derby
Official Website of FK Sarajevo
Official Website of FK Željezničar
Website of FK Sarajevo supporters
Website of FK Željezničar supporters 1
Website of FK Željezničar supporters 2
Unofficial Website of FK Sarajevo

FK Sarajevo
Football derbies in Bosnia and Herzegovina
Sport in Sarajevo
Recurring sporting events established in 1954
1954 establishments in Bosnia and Herzegovina